Summit County is a county in the U.S. state of Utah, occupying a rugged and mountainous area. As of the 2010 United States Census, the population was 36,324. Its county seat is Coalville, and the largest city is Park City.

History
The county was created by the Utah Territory legislature on January 13, 1854, with its description containing a portion of the future state of Wyoming. It was not organized then but was attached to Great Salt Lake County for administrative and judicial purposes. The county government was completed by March 4, 1861, so its attachment to the other county was terminated. The county boundaries were altered in 1856 and in 1862. In 1868 the Wyoming Territory was created by the US government, effectively de-annexing all Summit County areas falling within the new territory. The boundaries were further altered in 1872 and 1880. Its final alteration occurred on January 7, 1918, when Daggett's creation took a portion of its eastern territory. Its boundary has remained unchanged since that creation. It is so named because it includes 39 of the highest mountain peaks in Utah.

Owing to its proximity to Salt Lake City, Park City has acquired a reputation as an upscale getaway, bringing new development to the area.

Summit County is part of the Heber, UT Micropolitan Statistical Area, which is also included in the Salt Lake City-Provo-Orem, UT Combined Statistical Area.

Geography
Summit County lies on the upper east side of Utah. Its northeast borders abut the south and west borders of the state of Wyoming. Its central and eastern portion consists largely of the east-west oriented Uinta Mountains, while its western portion runs to the east slopes of the north-south oriented Wasatch Mountains. The county's highest point is Gilbert Peak, on the border with Duchesne County, at 13,448' (4099m) ASL.

Major highways

 Interstate 80
 Interstate 84
U.S. Route 40
 U.S. Route 189
 Utah State Route 32
 Utah State Route 150
 Utah State Route 224
 Utah State Route 248

Adjacent counties

 Rich County - north
 Uinta County, Wyoming - northeast
 Sweetwater County, Wyoming - northeast
 Daggett County - east
 Duchesne County - southeast
 Wasatch County - south
 Salt Lake County - southwest
 Morgan County - northwest
 Salt Lake County - west

Protected areas

 Ashley National Forest (part)
 Henefer-Echo Wildlife Management Area
 Rockport State Park
 Wasatch National Forest (part)

Lakes

 Abes Lake
 Adax Lake
 Alexander Lake
 Alligator Lake
 Allsop Lake
 Amethyst Lake
 Anchor Lake
 Azure Lake
 Baker Lake
 Bald Lake
 Ball and Moore Reservoir
 Barker Reservoir
 Bear Lake
 Beaver Lake (near Coffin Lake)
 Beaver Lake (near Duck Lake)
 Beaver Lake (near Whitney Reservoir)
 Beaver Meadow Reservoir
 Bench Lake
 Bennion Lake
 Beth Lake
 Big Elk Lake
 Blue Lake (near Boyer Lake)
 Blue Lake (near Haystack Lake)
 Bobs Lake
 Bourbon Lake
 Boyer Lake
 Bridger Lake
 Buckeye Lake
 Burnt Fork Lake
 Castle Lake (near Lake Blanchard)
 Castle Lake (near Shingle Creek Lakes)
 Chappell Lake
 China Lake
 Clegg Lake
 Cliff Lake (near Lake Blanchard)
 Cliff Lake (near Trial Lake)
 Clyde Lake
 Coffin Lake
 Crystal Lake
 Cuberant Lake
 Cutthroat Lake (near Island Lake)
 Cutthroat Lake (near Teal Lake)
 Dead Horse Lake
 Dean Lake
 Diamond Lake
 Dine Lake
 Dollar Lake
 Duck Lake (near Bald Lake)
 Duck Lake (near Fire Lake)
 East Red Castle Lake
 Echo Reservoir
 Elizabeth Lake
 Elkhorn Reservoir
 Erickson Lakes
 North Erickson Lake
 South Erickson Lake
 Fir Lake
 Fire Lake
 Fish Lake (near Burnt Fork Lake)
 Fish Lake (near Lyman Lake)
 Fish Lake (near Sand Lake)
 Gendy Lake
 Gilbert Lake
 Grahams Reservoir (part)
 Grass Lake
 Grassy Lakes
 Hayden Lake
 Haystack Lake
 Hell Hole Lake
 Henrys Fork Lake
 Hidden Lake (near Dine Lake)
 Hidden Lake (near Peter Lake)
 Hidden Lake (near Pot Reservoir)
 Hidden Lake (near Spirit Lake)
 Hidden Lake (near Tamarack Lake)
 Hidden Lake (near Smith and Morehouse Reservoir)
 Hoop Lake
 Hope Lake
 Hourglass Lake
 Ibantik Lake
 Island Lake (near Bennion Lake)
 Island Lake (near Grass Lake)
 Island Lake (near Ramona Lake)
 James Lake
 Jean Lake
 Jerry Lake
 Jessen Lake
 Jewel Lake
 John Lake
 Joyce Lake
 Kabell Lakes
 Kamas Lake
 Kermsuh Lake
 Lake Blanchard
 Lake Ejod
 Lake Hessie
 Lake Lorena
 Lake Marion
 Liberty Lake
 Lilly Lake
 Lily Lake
 Lily Lakes (aka Montgomery Lakes)
 Lily Pad Lake
 Linear Lake
 Little Elk Lake
 Little Lyman Lake
 Lofty Lake
 Long Lake
 Lost Lake (near Lilly Lake)
 Lost Lake (near Tamarack Lake)
 Lovenia Lake
 Lower Red Castle Lake
 Lower Yellow Pine Lake
 Lym Lake
 Lyman Lake
 Marjorie Lake
 Marsh Lake
 McPheters Lake
 Meadow Lake
 Meeks Cabin Reservoir (part)
 Moslander Reservoir
 Naomi Lake
 Norice Lake
 Notch Lake (Cliff Lake)
 Olsen Lake
 Ostler Lake
 Peter Lake
 Petit Lake
 Picturesque Lake
 Ponds Lake
 Porcupine Reservoir
 Pot Reservoir
 Priord Lake
 Quarter Corner Lake
 Ramona Lake
 Red Castle Lake
 Red Pine Lake
 Reids Lake
 Rhoads Lake
 Rock Lake
 Rockport Reservoir
 Round Lake
 Ruth Lake
 Ryder Lake
 Salamander Lake
 Salt Fish Lake
 Sand Lake
 Sargent Lake
 Sargent Lakes
 Sargent Number One Reservoir
 Sawmill Lake
 Scow Lake
 Shadow Lake (near Park City)
 Shadow Lake (near Tail Lake)
 Shallow Lake
 Shingle Creek Lakes
 East Shingle Creek Lake
 Lower Shingle Creek Lake
 West Shingle Creek Lake
 Shingle Mill Lake
 Shoestring Lake
 Smith and Morehouse Reservoir
 Smiths Fork Pass Lake
 Spectacle Lake
 Spirit Lake (part)
 Star Lake
 Stateline Reservoir
 Tail Lake
 Tamarack Lake
 Teal Lake
 Teapot Lake (aka Lost Lake Number 2)
 Three Divide Lakes
 Booker Lake
 Divide Lake 1
 Divide Lake 2
 Toomset Lake
 Trial Lake
 Trident Lake
 Twin Lakes
 North Twin Lake
 South Twin Lake
 Upper Red Castle Lake
 Upper Yellow Pine Lake
 Wall Lake
 Washington Lake
 Watson Lake
 Weir Reservoir
 Whiskey Island Lake
 White Pine Lake
 Whitney Reservoir

Demographics

2000 census
As of the 2000 United States Census, there were 29,736 people, 10,332 households, and 7,501 families in the county. The population density was 15.9/sqmi (6.13/km2). There were 17,489 housing units at an average density of 9.34/sqmi (3.61/km2). The racial makeup of the county was 91.80% White, 0.24% Black or African American, 0.31% Native American, 0.96% Asian, 0.04% Pacific Islander, 5.43% from other races, and 1.21% from two or more races.  8.09% of the population were Hispanic or Latino of any race.

There were 10,332 households, of which 40.80% had children under 18 living with them, 63.50% were married couples living together, 6.20% had a female householder with no husband present, and 27.40% were non-families. 18.40% of all households were made up of individuals, and 3.20% had someone living alone who was 65 years of age or older.  The average household size was 2.87, and the average family size was 3.30.

The median income for a household in the county was $64,962, and the median income for a family was $72,510. Males had a median income of $47,236 versus $28,621 for females. The per capita income for the county was $33,767. Only 42.9% are natives of Utah. 5.40% of the population and 3.00% of families were below the poverty line.

According to a 2000 survey by the Association of Statisticians of American Religious Bodies, Summit County is much more diverse in religious belief than Utah. Fully two in five people (44.2%) of the population claim no religion at all, while among those that do, The Church of Jesus Christ of Latter-day Saints (LDS Church) is the largest group at 36.8% (compared with some 66% statewide), followed by Roman Catholics at 10.6%.

Politics and government
Summit County has traditionally been a Republican stronghold. Since the 1990s, it has become more competitive due to the influence of Democrat-leaning Park City. Since then; Democrats have at times won a plurality or even a majority of the countywide votes. In 1996, Bill Clinton became the first Democrat to win the county since Lyndon Johnson's 44-state landslide in 1964 and only the second Democrat to carry it since Franklin D. Roosevelt. Although George W. Bush carried the county in 2000 and 2004, his performance there was worst in the state. In a 2006 US Senate race, Summit County was the only county carried by Democrat Pete Ashdown even as the Republican incumbent Orrin Hatch carried the state as a whole by a 2 to 1 margin. Likewise, in the 2008 U.S. presidential election, Barack Obama carried the county by a 15.3% margin over John McCain, while McCain carried Utah by 28.1% over Obama. However, in the 2012 presidential election, Republican Mitt Romney defeated Obama in the county, 51% to 46%. In 2016, Democrat Hillary Clinton defeated Republican Donald Trump, 50% to 35%. The county is no more Republican in gubernatorial politics. In both the 2012 and 2016 elections it was the only county to support the Democratic candidate over Gary Herbert.

In the 2016 Senate race, Summit County was the only county in Utah where a plurality voted for Democratic nominee Misty Snow against Republican incumbent Mike Lee. Snow was the first major-party transgender Senate candidate in United States history, making the county the first in the nation to vote for a transgender candidate for the Senate.

On the county level, most of the elected offices are held by Democrats, including four of the five seats on the newly created Summit County Council. -John Hanrahan, D; Claudia McMullin, D; Sally Elliott, D; Chris Robinson, D; David Ure, R

Summit County was one of only two counties (along with Grand County) to vote against Utah's same-sex marriage ban in 2004. In June 2010, Summit County became the sixth local government of Utah to prohibit discrimination in employment or housing based on a person's sexual orientation or gender identity.

Communities

Cities

 Coalville (county seat)
 Kamas
 Oakley
 Park City

Towns
 Francis
 Henefer

Census-designated places

 East Basin
 Echo
 Hoytsville
 Marion
 Peoa
 Samak
 Silver Summit
 Snyderville
 Summit Park
 Wanship
 Woodland

Unincorporated communities

 Alpine Acres
 Bountiful Peak Summer Home Area
 Castle Rock
 Christmas Meadows Summer Home Area
 Emory
 Grass Creek
 Holiday Park
 Monviso
 Rockport
 Uintalands
 Upton
 Weber Canyon

Former communities
 Atkinson
 Blacks Fork
 Mill City
 Wahsatch

Education
There are three school districts covering sections of the county:
 North Summit School District
 Park City School District
 South Summit School District

See also

 List of counties in Utah
 National Register of Historic Places listings in Summit County, Utah
 Utah Transfer of Public Lands Act

References

External links

 

 
Salt Lake City metropolitan area
1861 establishments in Utah Territory
Populated places established in 1861
Micropolitan areas of Utah